John Bayard McPherson (November 5, 1846 – January 20, 1919) was a United States circuit judge of the United States Court of Appeals for the Third Circuit and previously was a United States district judge of the United States District Court for the Eastern District of Pennsylvania.

Education and career

Born in Harrisburg, Pennsylvania, McPherson attended the College of New Jersey (now Princeton University), receiving an Artium Baccalaureus degree in 1866 and an Artium Magister degree in 1869. He read law in 1870. He was in private practice in Harrisburg beginning in 1870. From 1874 to 1877 he was district attorney of Dauphin County, Pennsylvania, and from 1882 to 1899 served as a state court judge of the Court of Common Pleas in Harrisburg. Beginning in 1890, he taught at the University of Pennsylvania.

Federal judicial service

McPherson was nominated by President William McKinley on February 28, 1899, to a seat on the United States District Court for the Eastern District of Pennsylvania vacated by Judge William Butler. He was confirmed by the United States Senate on March 2, 1899, and received his commission the same day. His service terminated on April 8, 1912, due to his elevation to the Third Circuit.

McPherson was nominated by President William Howard Taft on March 16, 1912, to a seat on the United States Court of Appeals for the Third Circuit vacated by Judge William M. Lanning. He was confirmed by the Senate on April 3, 1912, and received his commission the same day. His service terminated on January 20, 1919, due to his death in Philadelphia, Pennsylvania.

References

Sources
 

1846 births
1919 deaths
Judges of the United States District Court for the Eastern District of Pennsylvania
United States federal judges appointed by William McKinley
Judges of the United States Court of Appeals for the Third Circuit
United States court of appeals judges appointed by William Howard Taft
20th-century American judges
19th-century American politicians
Politicians from Harrisburg, Pennsylvania
Princeton University alumni
United States federal judges admitted to the practice of law by reading law
University of Pennsylvania Law School alumni